Chappie may refer to:

People

Surname
 Eugene A. Chappie (1920–1992), United States Congressman

Nickname or given name
 Jack Blackburn (1883–1942), American boxer and boxing trainer, nicknamed "Chappie" by Joe Louis, his most famous pupil
 Charles Coventry (Zimbabwean cricketer), nicknamed "Chappie"
 Chappie Dwyer (1894–1975), Australian cricketer
 Chappie Fox (1913–2003), American circus historian and philanthropist
 Chappie Geygan (1903–1966), American Major League Baseball shortstop
 Daniel James Jr. (1920–1978), U.S. Air Force fighter pilot, first African American four-star general
 Chappie Johnson (1876–1949), American baseball catcher and field manager in the Negro leagues
 Chappie McFarland (1875–1924), American Major League Baseball pitcher
 Chappie Sheppell, American soccer player from 1934 to 1950
 Chappie Snodgrass (1870–1951), American Major League Baseball outfielder

Arts and entertainment
 Chappie Angulo (born 1928), American-Mexican painter and illustrator born Ruth Chapman Maruschok
 Chappie (film), a 2015 American science fiction film by Neill Blomkamp
Chappie, character in the film Chappie, played by Sharlto Copley
 Stanford Chaparral (aka the Chappie), a humor magazine published by students of Stanford University
 Chappie, protagonist and narrator of the 1995 novel Rule of the Bone by Russell Banks
 Coach Charles "Chappie" Davis, a character played by Sonny Jim Gaines in the 1981 television movie The Sophisticated Gents

Other uses
Chappie, pet food sold by Pedigree Petfoods
Chappies, a brand of bubblegum owned by Cadbury

See also
 Max Miller (comedian) (1894–1963), British front-cloth comedian known as the "Cheeky Chappie"
 Chappy (disambiguation)

Lists of people by nickname